Gregory II may refer to:

 Pope Gregory II (715–731)
 Gregory II of Naples (766–794)
 Gregory II, Count of Tusculum (1044–1058)
 Gregory II the Martyrophile (1066–1105)
 Patriarch Gregory II of Constantinople (1283–1289)
 Patriarch Gregory II of Alexandria (1316–1354)
 Gregory II Bulgarian (–1474)
 Gregory II Youssef (1864–1897)
 Joseph Gregorio II (1857–1868)